Khalifa Award for Education is an educational award founded by Khalifa bin Zayed Al Nahyan, the President of the United Arab Emirates and the Ruler of Abu Dhabi. It includes all categories of those working in the field of education in the UAE and in the Arab world.

it aims to release the potential capabilities of educators by creating an environment conducive to enabling educators to excel in an honest competition that releases their innovative capabilities and recognises their outstanding educational skills. The Award was founded under the patronage of Sheikh Khalifa bin Zayed Al Nahyan, the President of the United Arab Emirates, and thrives under the continuous follow-up of Sheikh Mohammed bin Zayed Al Nahyan, Abu Dhabi Crown Prince, Deputy Supreme Commander of the UAE Armed Forces, and the continuous guidance by Sheikh Mansour bin Zayed Al Nahyan, Deputy Prime Minister, Minister of Presidential Affairs and the Chairman of the Council of Trustees of the Khalifa Award for Education. In line with these directions, the Award’s Council of Trustees, its Secretariat General and its Executive Committee decided to include all categories of those working in the educational field both within the UAE and in the wider Arab world. The Award shall include the following categories at the local level: General Education; Education for People with Special Needs; Creating Knowledge Networks; New Media and Education; Education and the Sustainable Environment; and Education and Community Service.

There are five other general educational categories within the UAE and throughout the Arab world, namely: Higher Education; Educational Research; Projects and Innovative Educational Programmes, Educational Authoring for Children, and a Written Academic Work about the Patron of the Award, Sheikh Khalifa bin Zayed Al Nahyan, the President of the United Arab Emirates.

The Award’s major objective is to motivate and promote the development of the educational field within the UAE, and in the Arab world at large, based on the conviction by the Award’s board and General Secretariat that both of these fields complements each other. Since its inception, the Khalifa Award for Education, as a pioneering institution, is committed to the promotion of excellence and a culture of innovation, and the celebration of distinguished skills within the educational field.

References

See also 
 Official website

Education awards
Education in the United Arab Emirates
Emirati awards